The Circles of Power (1994) is volume fifteen in the French comic book science fiction series Valérian and Laureline, created by writer Pierre Christin and artist Jean-Claude Mézières.

Synopsis

Valérian and Laureline have brought their crippled astroship to a repair yard in the First Circle on the planet Rubanis, but have no money to pay for it. They are approached by three Shingouz who advise them to visit Colonel T'loc, the chief of police, who has a job for them.

They are driven by flying cab through the chaotic traffic of the First Circle of the city into the Second Circle. They proceed to the orbital station and T'loc's headquarters. The colonel says that he is concerned about trouble brewing in the Circles. The police force are corrupt so he is turning to Valérian and Laureline to help him. He describes the five Circles of Rubanis: the First, dedicated to heavy industry; the Second, designated for business, and the Third, dedicated to shopping and entertainment. The Fourth Circle is dedicated to the aristopatrons: the leaders of the religions, public service, and business. T'loc receives his orders from this Circle via a machine in his office, but he has received none for a long time.

Valérian and Laureline ask to examine the machine but T'loc forbids it, saying they would risk their lives. He wants the couple to investigate the Fifth and final Circle – the Circle of Power, a Circle that no one enters, and offers them seven hundred thousand bloutoks. Valérian moves to open the machine and T'loc pulls his gun, warning that if the machine is opened, the Scunindar virus will spread. T'loc agrees to double their risk bonus, and also gives them an advance payment, a Grumpy Transmuter from Bluxte, able to duplicate any currency .

T'loc's deputy, Indicator Croupachof, gives them a contact to start their inquiries. They plan to go to the Third Circle but, while flying through the Second Circle, they are attacked by a woman driving a black limousine, who crashes her vehicle. Landing in the Third Circle, Valérian, Laureline and S'Traks, the taxi driver, go to a bar to meet the contact. They find that the Shingouz are also in the bar to introduce this figure. The contact demands 100 Ebebe pearls for the information.  Laureline puts the grumpy to work, and the contact says there is a way into the Fifth Circle through an old, abandoned entrance.  They are interrupted by Na'Zultra, the woman in the limousine, who is accompanied by henchmen and swinging a whip. Laureline and the Shingouz are mesmerized; the contact is shot while trying to escape. The henchmen grab Laureline and make off with her. Valérian is too late to catch them.

S'Traks thinks he can find Na'Zultra through mechanics, who will recover her crashed limousine.  Valérian and S'Traks return to it and hide in the wreck. The recovery vehicle takes them and the limousine into the Fourth Circle.  As they explore, a group of aristopatrons – priests, high officials and businessmen –march by. S'Traks is shocked by their appearance: their necks have elongated and their heads have shrunk.  Valérian and S'Traks steal clothes of stragglers to disguise themselves and follow the crowd.

Elsewhere, Na'Zultra is interrogating Laureline.  Na'Zultra says she intends to seize power and demands Laureline's information from the contact.  But Laureline says the contact was killed before he could tell her anything. Na'Zultra threatens Laureline with a machine that will infect her with the Scunindar virus. This process is interrupted by watchmen warning of outsiders at an aristopatron meeting.  Thinking they must be Valerian and S'Traks, Na'Zultra departs, leaving only one man to guard Laureline, still strapped into the machine. She outwits the guard, knocks him unconscious, and explores the Fourth Circle. with her men leaving just one guard to look after Laureline who is still strapped into the machine.

Laureline finds a group of aristopatrons connected to a series of the machines that release the Scunindar virus.  Further, she finds Valérian and S'Traks, pinned down by fire from Na'Zultra and her Vlago-Vlago mercenaries, but all three escape.

Valérian, Laureline and S'Traks plan next steps. In the Third Circle, Laureline meets the Shingouz again.  She notices how entranced the population is by the screens that located all around the Circle.  The Shingouz explain that these are a variation on the machines in the Fourth Circle. Laureline asks the Shingouz if they can find the ancient service entrance to the Circle of Power.  They say they know of a man who may have a set of plans.

Arriving at police headquarters, Valérian notices Croupachof's surprise at seeing him again and realises that it was he who warned Na'Zultra.  Meeting with T'loc, Valérian asks why he has been sent on a useless mission since T'loc not only already knows that the aristopatrons have succumbed to the Scunindar virus but that he also has an antidote.  Valérian points to the machine and asks to use it – he will protect himself from the virus by using T'loc's antidote.

Elsewhere, in the First Circle, S'Traks is assembling his army from the best pilots in the city.

In the Second Circle with the Shingouz, Laureline visits Dr. Zoump, the real estate salesman who may have a map of the Fifth Circle.

Valérian, connected to the machine, is presented with a series of strange images, including that of the mysterious Hyper-Prince.  Switching off, Valérian asks T'loc if he is aware that they are putting together an expedition to go into the Circle of Power and find out who is transmitting the images.  T'loc replies that he does and that he is also assembling a team of his own.  They will move once the entrance has been located.  T'loc gives Valerian the agreed fee of one million, seven hundred thousand bloutoks.  As Valérian is picked up from T'loc's headquarters by S'Traks, he notices the large armada of police vehicles that T'loc is assembling.  S'Traks replies that his team is even larger.

In the Second Circle, Dr Zoump gives them the map for a fee.  Laureline and the Shingouz leave just before Na'Zultra and Croupachof arrive, who are also seeking the map.

Valérian is reunited with Laureline and the Shingouz at the rendezvous point where the S'Traks' has assembled the team for the assault on the Circle of Power.  They take off, closely monitored by both Na'Zultra and her mercenaries and T'loc and his police force. Valérian, Laureline and S'Traks punch their way in at the entrance, but find only a derelict room with cameras transmitting images of the Hyper-Prince and Scunindar virus. The Hyper-Prince lies before the cameras. Unaffected by the virus, Valerian snatches the ring of authority from his finger, which is no longer potent. At that moment T'loc and Na'Zultra burst in.  As fighting breaks out between the forces, Valérian, Laureline and the Shingouz escape.

Some time later, Valerian and Laureline depart Rubanis by their repaired astroship. The Shingouz tell them S'Traks is winning the battle on Rubanis!

Main characters
 Valérian, a spatio-temporal agent from Galaxity, future capital of Earth, in the 28th century
 Laureline, originally from France in the 11th century, now a spatio-temporal agent of Galaxity in the 28th century
 The Shingouz, a group of three aliens who trade in information
 S'Traks, a cabdriver on the planet Rubanis
 Colonel T'loc, chief of police on Rubanis
 Indicator Croupachof, aide to Colonel T'loc
 Na'Zultra, an ambitious power-hungry mercenary. Heads a band of mercenaries from Vlago-Vlago
 Dr Zoup, a former real-estate salesman

Setting
The planet Rubanis in the Constellation of Cassiopeia, previously seen  in Métro Châtelet, Direction Cassiopeia and The Ghosts of Inverloch. Since The Ghosts of Inverloch, Colonel T'loc has relocated his headquarters to an orbital platform. The robot thanatologists seen in The Ghosts of Inverloch seem to have disappeared. As in previous albums, the never-ending traffic congestion is a hallmark of the planet.

Rubanis is composed of five distinct circles:
 The First Circle. Where all of Rubanis' heavy industry is located. The most anarchic part of the planet.
 The Second Circle. The business district. More regulated than the first circle. Floating mines keep the traffic in order. However, businessmen flinging themselves from their buildings when the stock exchange crashes can cause a hazard to traffic.
 The Third Circle. Where merchants, amusements and arts congregate.
 The Fourth Circle. Home to high priests, respected public officials and the business aristocracy.
 The Fifth Circle. The mysterious circle of power.

Notes

 Colonel T'loc previously appeared in The Ghosts of Inverloch where it was revealed that he had the Scunindar virus. The antidote he now possesses presumably comes from Orq-The-Healer whose location T'loc was given by the Shingouz in that album.
 A Grumpy Transmuter from Bluxte was first seen in Ambassador of the Shadows.
 A cretiniser whip was first seen in On the Frontiers.
 This album was a major influence on the 1997 Luc Besson film The Fifth Element. Jean-Claude Mézières was contracted in 1991 to provide concept art for the film. He produced concepts for the futuristic New York, with its flying cars, as well as the Fhloston Paradise space-liner. When the production on the film was suspended in 1993, Besson turned to making the film Léon and Mézières returned to Valérian where he reworked several of the concepts he had been working on into The Circles of Power — most notably the flying taxi cabs. When the album was finished in 1994, Mézières sent a copy to Besson who was so taken with the cab-driving character of S'Traks that he rewrote the script of The Fifth Element, changing the occupation of protagonist Korben Dallas from a worker in a rocketship factory to cab driver. The film resumed production in 1996 and was released in 1997.
 The Circles of Power was translated into English by Timothy Ryan Smith and published, along with On the Frontiers and The Living Weapons in the same volume, in November 2004 by iBooks under the title Valerian: The New Future Trilogy. The pages were shrunk from their normal size to US comic book size.
 In 1995, this album was nominated for a Haxtur Award for Best Short Comic Strip, at the Salón Internacional del Cómic del Principado de Asturias (International Comics Convention of the Principality of Asturia, Spain).

References
Citations

Bibliography
 Mézières, J-C. (1998), Les Extras de Mézières No.2 (Mon Cinquieme Element), Dargaud, Paris, .
 Mézières, J-C. and Christin, P.(2004), Valerian: The New Future Trilogy, trans. T.R. Smith, iBooks, New York,  .
 The Fifth Element (1997), film, directed by Luc Besson, France: Pathé.

1994 graphic novels
Valérian and Laureline